Nadezhda Nikolaevna Kibardina (born 8 February 1956) is a retired USSR female road and track cyclist and four-time world champion. In 1980 and in 1981 she became world champion on the track in the individual pursuit and she became world champion in 1987 and 1989 on the road in the team time trial. At the 1983 Summer Universiade she won the gold medal on the road in the women's road race and on the track in the women's individual pursuit and the silver medal in the women's 500 m time trial. In 1993 she won the time trial at the road national championships.

See also

References

1956 births
Living people
Soviet female cyclists
Russian female cyclists
UCI Road World Champions (women)
People from Naberezhnye Chelny
UCI Track Cycling World Champions (women)
Universiade medalists in cycling
Russian track cyclists
Universiade gold medalists for the Soviet Union
Medalists at the 1983 Summer Universiade
Sportspeople from Tatarstan